Chris Zuvela (born 21 January 1997), is an Australian professional footballer who plays as a midfielder. He made his professional debut for Sydney FC in the 2018 AFC Champions League group stage match against Kashima Antlers on 13 March 2018.

Personal life
Born in Australia, Zuvela is of Croatian descent.

Honours

Club
Sydney FC
A-League Premiership: 2017–2018, 2019–20
A-League Championship: 2019–20

References

External links

1997 births
Living people
Australian soccer players
Australian people of Croatian descent
Association football midfielders
Sydney FC players
Sydney United 58 FC players
National Premier Leagues players